Halvans, Helwan or Haluan may refer to:

 Haluan (newspaper), a daily newspaper in Padang, Indonesia
 Halvan, Kurdistan, Iran
 Halvan, South Khorasan, Iran
 Helwan, a city in Egypt

See also
 Holwan (disambiguation)